Slomer Cove (‘Zaliv Slomer’ \'za-liv 'slo-mer\) is the 11.2 km wide cove indenting for 5.9 km the northwest coast of Trinity Peninsula, Antarctic Peninsula south of Cape Kjellman and north of Auster Point.

The cove is named after the settlement of Slomer in northern Bulgaria. This name originates from Bulgaria.
It is part of the Bulgaria Gazetteer and the SCAR Composite Gazetteer of Antarctica.

Location
German-British mapping in 1996.

Maps
 Trinity Peninsula. Scale 1:250000 topographic map No. 5697. Institut für Angewandte Geodäsie and British Antarctic Survey, 1996.
 Antarctic Digital Database (ADD). Scale 1:250000 topographic map of Antarctica. Scientific Committee on Antarctic Research (SCAR). Since 1993, regularly updated.

References
 Bulgarian Antarctic Gazetteer. Antarctic Place-names Commission. (details in Bulgarian, basic data in English)
 Slomer Cove. SCAR Composite Antarctic Gazetteer

External links
 Slomer Cove. Copernix satellite image

Coves of Graham Land
Landforms of Trinity Peninsula
Bulgaria and the Antarctic